Pauliina Susi (born January 14, 1968, in Helsinki) is a Finnish writer. Her debut novel Ruuhkavuosi was nominated for the Helsingin Sanomat Literature Prize in 2005. In 2016, she received a Lead of the Year award from the Finnish Detective Society for her book Takaikkuna (2015).

References 

1968 births
Living people
Finnish writers
Writers from Helsinki